Boltyansky, Boltyanski or Boltyanskii (Russian: Болтянский) is a Russian masculine surname; its feminine counterpart is Boltyanskaya. It may refer to
Natella Boltyanskaya (born 1965), Russian journalist, singer-songwriter, poet and radio host 
Vladimir Boltyansky (1925–2019), Russian mathematician

Russian-language surnames